Home This Year is the sixth album by rock band Virginia Coalition.

Track listing
 "Home This Year" - 4:01
 "Santa Fe" - 4:23
 "Stars Align" - 3:59
 "Not Scared" - 4:07
 "Same Page" - 3:34
 "Sing Along" - 4:40
 "Lately" - 4:05
 "A Desperate Way" - 3:57
 "Look My Way" - 3:46
 "I Got This One" - 3:58

References

External links

2008 albums
Virginia Coalition albums